Huarisayana (possibly from Aymara wari vicuña, Quechua sayana stop, whereabouts, a place where you stop frequently, "vicuña stop") is a mountain in the Vilcanota mountain range in the Andes of Peru, about  high. It is located in the Cusco Region, Quispicanchi Province, Marcapata District, and in the Puno Region, Carabaya Province, Corani District. Huarisayana lies south of Jori Pintay, southwest of Taruca Sayana, northeast of Viscachani and southeast of Tocllayoc.

References

Mountains of Cusco Region
Mountains of Puno Region
Mountains of Peru